The Rescue is a 2021 documentary film directed and produced by Elizabeth Chai Vasarhelyi and Jimmy Chin. It follows the Tham Luang cave rescue, a 2018 mission that saved a junior association football team from an underwater cave.

The film had its world premiere at the 48th Telluride Film Festival on September 2, 2021, and was theatrically released in the United States on October 8, 2021.

Synopsis 
The film follows the Tham Luang cave rescue.

Production 
In March 2019, it was announced Kevin Macdonald would direct a documentary film revolving around the Tham Luang cave rescue, with National Geographic Documentary Films set to produce.  In February 2021, it was announced Elizabeth Chai Vasarhelyi and Jimmy Chin would replace Macdonald as director, though he would remain as executive producer on the project.

The filmmakers had difficulty securing rights to the story, with National Geographic able to secure the rights to the divers' story, while Netflix had acquired rights to the experiences of the soccer team, preventing them from telling their story in the film.

Release 
The film had its world premiere at the 48th Telluride Film Festival on September 2, 2021. It was also screened at the 2021 Toronto International Film Festival on September 12, 2021, where it won the People's Choice Award for Documentaries.

Greenwich Entertainment will distribute the film in the United States.

Reception

Box office 
In its opening weekend, the film made $69,669 from five theaters.

Critical response 
According to review aggregator website Rotten Tomatoes, 96% of 91 critics have given the film a positive review, with an average rating of 8.5/10. Metacritic assigned the film a weighted average score of 86 out of 100 based on 18 critics, indicating "universal acclaim".

Michael O'Sullivan of The Washington Post gave the film 4/4 stars, writing: "As with Chin and Vasarhelyi's previous films, ignore any instinct you may have to pass up this movie because it sounds too hyper-specific: an activity you're not really that interested in, and a story whose ending you've already heard." Simran Hans of The Observer gave the film 4/5 stars, describing it as a "hugely involving documentary", and wrote: "Vasarhelyi and Chin recreate the sense of the clock running down as oxygen levels in the cave decrease, while the monsoon outside rages." Kevin Maher of The Times also gave the film 4/5 stars, writing: "the film-makers somehow manage to wring nerve-jangling tension from a foregone conclusion". John Lui of The Straits Times also gave the film 4/5 stars, writing: "By calmly describing everything that could go wrong while hauling 13 non-divers across 4 km of twisty, submerged passages, the experts evoke a sense of dread that would make a horror film-maker proud." Leslie Felperin of The Guardian gave the film 3/5 stars, writing: "Not only is the story compelling, but thanks to how much the event captured the interest of the world's media, there is a lot of archive footage to splice in among the generous wodges of talking-heads narration from the main participants." However, she criticized the music used towards the end of the film as "cheesy" and questioned why the rescued children were not interviewed.

Roxana Hadadi of RogerEbert.com was more critical of the film, giving it 2.5/4 stars. She wrote: "between Vasarhelyi and Chin's inability to speak with the boys or their families, and the documentary's initially languid pacing, "The Rescue" feels like half a story told fairly well, but still, half a story." Cassie Da Costa of Vanity Fair wrote that the film "plods along without taking any formal risks", adding: "I couldn't shake the feeling of watching a network TV documentary, designed to feed the audience with detail after detail, but not to generate any significant ideas from the facts and images it contains."

Awards and nominations

See also 
 The Cave (2019 Thai film), 2019 Thai action-drama film about these events.
Thirteen Lives – 2022 film directed by Ron Howard

References

External links 
 Rescue | National Geographic Documentary Films | Interview with Co-Director Chai Vasarhelyi
 

2021 films
2021 documentary films
American documentary films
British documentary films
Documentary films about underwater diving
National Geographic Society films
Films directed by Elizabeth Chai Vasarhelyi
Films directed by Jimmy Chin
Films scored by Daniel Pemberton
Films shot in Chiang Rai province
Tham Luang cave rescue
2020s English-language films
2020s American films
2020s British films